Phibun Rak is a district (amphoe) in central Udon Thani province, northeastern Thailand.

Geography
Neighboring districts are (from the north clockwise) Nong Han, Chai Wan, Si That, Kumphawapi, and Prachaksinlapakhom.

History
The minor district (king amphoe) was established on 1 April 1992 by splitting three tambons from Nong Han district. It was upgraded to a full district on 11 October 1997.

Administration
The district is divided into three sub-districts (tambons), which are further subdivided into 37 villages (mubans). There are no municipal (thesaban) areas, and three tambon administrative organizations (TAO).

References

External links
amphoe.com

Phibun Rak